Joseph or Joe Malone may refer to:

Joseph R. Malone (born 1949), American politician
Joseph Malone (VC) (1833–1883), VC recipient
Joseph Malone (actor), an actor on the Tracy Ullman Show
Joseph Malone (archer) (born 1957), Irish archer
Joe Malone (footballer) (1924–2018), Australian rules footballer
Joe Malone (1890–1969), member of the Hockey Hall of Fame
Joe Malone (politician) (born 1954), Republican politician from Massachusetts

See also
Jo Malone (born 1963), British businesswoman